TruTV (stylized as truTV) is an American basic cable channel owned by Warner Bros. Discovery (WBD). The channel primarily broadcasts comedy, docusoaps and reality shows.

The channel was originally launched in 1991 as Court TV, a network that focused on crime-themed programs such as true crime documentary series, legal dramas, and coverage of prominent criminal cases. The channel was initially a joint venture between Time Warner, American Lawyer Media, Cablevision, and NBC, with Liberty Media later joining the venture as well.

By 2005, Liberty Media and Time Warner had purchased ALM, Cablevision and NBC's stakes in Court TV. Time Warner subsequently bought out Liberty's share in 2006 for $735 million, and brought the channel under its Turner Broadcasting subsidiary. In 2008, the channel relaunched as TruTV, changing its focus to action-oriented docusoaps and "caught on camera" programs, which it marketed as "actuality" television. The channel continued to carry legal coverage during the daytime hours under the title In Session, but this was phased out by September 2013.

In 2011, the channel began to add occasional sports broadcasts from Turner Sports, primarily the NCAA men's basketball tournament. In October 2014, TruTV pivoted its format to focus more on comedy-based reality series, such as Impractical Jokers.

As of January 2016, TruTV is available to approximately 91 million households (78.1%) in the United States.

History

Court TV

The Courtroom Television Network, or Court TV for short, was launched on July 1, 1991, at 6:00 a.m. Eastern Time, and was available to three million subscribers. Its original anchors were Jack Ford, Fred Graham, Cynthia McFadden, and Gregg Jarrett. The network was born out of two competing projects to launch cable channels with live courtroom proceedings, the American Trial Network from Time Warner and American Lawyer Media (ALM), and In Court from Cablevision and NBC. Both projects were present at the National Cable Television Association in June 1990. Rather than trying to establish two competing networks, the projects were combined on December 14, 1990. Liberty Media would join the venture in 1991.

The channel originally consisted of live courtroom trials that are interspersed with anchors and reporters. It was led by law writer Steven Brill, who later left the network in 1997. The network came into its own during the Menendez brothers' first trial in 1994, and the O.J. Simpson murder trial in 1995.

In 1997, Time Warner acquired ALM to gain ownership of its stake in Court TV; it subsequently sold its publications to a private equity fund in 1998. In 1998, NBC sold its share of the network to Time Warner. That same year, Court TV began running several original and acquired programs in prime time, such as Homicide: Life on the Street, Cops, and Forensic Files.

In 2001, Court TV purchased The Smoking Gun, a website that focuses on legal items such as mug shots and other public documents pertaining to famous individuals and cases. The site remained a property of the company through the rebranding to TruTV, but was sold back to its founder in 2014. In the same year, Court TV also purchased the website Crime Library, which provided detailed information about infamous crimes and how they were solved. The website remained an actively updated TruTV property until 2014 and was taken offline in 2015.

On February 3, 2003, "Court TV Plus" debuted on Sirius Satellite Radio, featuring audio from Court TV programs. Launched on Channel 134, it was moved in September 2005 and aired on Channel 110 until the channel ceased operations on January 1, 2008.

Recognizing the growth of its primetime programming, Court TV announced in 2005 that it would split its programming into two brands. Daytime trial coverage was branded as Court TV News, while other dayparts—promoted under the tagline "Seriously Entertaining"—focused on reality shows dealing with crime-related topics. In January 2006, the network launched a male-targeted programming block known as "RED" ("Real. Exciting. Dramatic.").

In May 2006, Time Warner acquired Liberty Media's stake in Court TV for $735 million, valuing the channel at $1.5 billion. The channel was integrated into Time Warner's Turner Broadcasting unit; executives indicated that Court TV planned to maintain its existing format, and did not rule out creating synergies with CNN for their legal coverage. In 2007, the channel premiered its first original scripted series, 'Til Death Do Us Part—an anthology of crime re-enactments hosted by filmmaker John Waters.

TruTV

On July 11, 2007, Time Warner announced that Court TV would be relaunched as TruTV on January 1, 2008. The new brand was intended to accompany a larger shift towards action-oriented reality series which did not necessarily involve crime or law enforcement, such as Black Gold, Hardcore Pawn, Lizard Lick Towing, Ocean Force, and the caught-on-camera series World's Dumbest. TruTV promoted its new positioning under the slogan "Not Reality. Actuality."; network staff argued that the term "reality" had become associated with "unrealistic" programming, and that it wanted to emphasize that its new programs would feature "real" people.

As part of the re-branding as TruTV, daytime trial coverage was cut back to 9:00 a.m. to 3:00 p.m. ET and branded as In Session. In 2009, production of the program was shifted to the facilities of HLN in Atlanta. On March 4, 2013, In Session was cut to a two-hour, taped format. On September 30, 2013, In Session was cancelled, and replaced by a block of library programming under the title In Session Presents.

In 2011, as part of a new partnership between CBS Sports and Turner Sports, TruTV began to broadcast coverage of the NCAA Division I men's basketball tournament.

Reruns of Court TV series have since aired on HLN (primarily Forensic Files), and have also been syndicated to the over-the-air digital network Justice Network. With changes to HLN's programming strategy and the growing popularity of the genre, the network began to produce and premiere more original true crime programs in 2017. In December 2018, Turner sold the rights to the Court TV brand and programming library to Scripps Media subsidiary Katz Broadcasting, which relaunched it as an over-the-air digital network in May 2019, reviving the dormant brand after 11 years.

Shift to comedy 
Although noting that it had experienced "tremendous success" with individual programs, TruTV's new president and head of programming Chris Linn explained that the network's overall growth as a brand had been hindered due to its lingering association with Court TV and its tone of programming, and its reliance on "conflict-reliant, heavy, dramatic and maybe overly produced" docuseries with derivative premises. In April 2014, the network announced that it would undergo a brand repositioning for the 2014–15 television season aimed towards "funseekers", with a focus on comedy-oriented docusoaps, semi-scripted series, sketch comedies and reality competitions.

Building upon the success of Impractical Jokers (which Linn compared to a "canary in the coal mine" due to its contrasting premise to other truTV programs at the time) and The Carbonaro Effect, the network greenlit a number of new series as part of the re-launch, including Barmageddon, the "reality musical" Branson Famous, Fake Off, Hack My Life, and Kart Life. As part of the re-launch, a new branding campaign ("Way More Fun") and refreshed logo (temporarily branding the network as The New truTV) were introduced on-air on October 27, 2014; the branding is meant to portray the network in a lighter manner.

Since the repositioning, TruTV has also parodied its temporary prominence during the NCAA tournament with various advertising campaigns, seeking to promote the channel and its programming to the expanded audience. A common theme of these campaigns, which have included the 2015 social media campaign "#HaveUFoundtrutv", and a "truTV Awareness Month" campaign in 2018, involve commenting upon viewers who were unaware of the channel or trying to find it on their television provider's lineup. Of the former, Puja Vohra, Senior vice president of marketing and digital, explained that the campaign was intended to portray the network's brand as being "fun" and "self-aware".

In December 2016, truTV unveiled a new marketing campaign and slogan, "Funny Because It's tru". The campaign reinforced the network's focus on comedy by parodying the "cliches" of network television promos.

On March 4, 2019, AT&T announced a major reorganization of its broadcasting assets to effectively dissolve Turner Broadcasting. Its assets were dispersed across multiple units of WarnerMedia with TruTV along with TBS, TNT and HBO moving to newly formed WarnerMedia Entertainment.

High definition
The 1080i high definition simulcast feed of TruTV is available on all major cable and satellite providers. In March 2011, the channel saw carriage of its HD feed increase, due to its coverage of the 2011 NCAA Division I men's basketball tournament (and subsequent tournaments), which was its first ever live sports telecast.

Programming

Presently, TruTV airs a mix of original comedy-genre reality and lifestyle series (such as Impractical Jokers, The Carbonaro Effect, and Adam Ruins Everything), as well as acquired sitcoms and films.

Sports programming
On February 8, 2010, TruTV premiered NFL Full Contact, a show that gave a behind-the-scenes look at the television production for major football events such as the Super Bowl, the NFL Draft, the Pro Bowl, and the season opener; the show was not renewed for a second season.

On March 15, 2011, TruTV began airing live sports programming for the first time with its telecasts of the 2011 NCAA Division I men's basketball tournament. The agreement is part of a contract between Turner Sports and CBS Sports resulting in shared coverage of the NCAA men's tournament through 2032. TruTV airs games during the opening rounds of the tournament, and exclusively carries the First Four play-in round, which was concurrently introduced the same year. It also carries the studio show Inside March Madness during the tournament. Until its discontinuation, TruTV also aired the pre-season Coaches vs. Cancer Classic. In May 2016, TruTV broadcast the opening rounds of the inaugural NCAA Beach Volleyball Championship; Turner would also televise the event in 2017.

In 2015, TruTV carried a series of HBO-produced Top Rank boxing telecasts under the title MetroPCS Friday Night Knockout, as a companion to HBO World Championship Boxing.

In 2021, TruTV began to serve as an overflow outlet for the NHL on TNT, in the event that a game in a TNT doubleheader runs long.

As Court TV

As Court TV, the channel's programming traditionally consisted of reality legal programming and legal dramas, such as legal-based news shows, legal-based talk shows, live homicide trial coverage, court shows, police force shows, and other criminal justice programming.

The channel also carried a week-daily news block, In Session (the successor to Court TV News), which provided live coverage of trials, legal news and details of highly publicized crimes Monday through Fridays from 9 to 11 a.m. ET (except during national holidays, with reruns of the channel's reality programming airing in place of the block on such days). Its coverage included analysis from anchors and guests to help viewers understand legal proceedings. In Session also ran a blog, Sidebar, where the In Session team posted updated legal news and analysis. In Session moved to a new studio in Atlanta at the CNN Center on November 16, 2009. Online coverage of current trials later moved to CNN.com's "Crime" section and production of the block was eventually taken over by sister network HLN. In Session anchors also appeared on CNN to provide legal analysis about current crime stories and trials. In Session ended its run on September 26, 2013.

International

Canada
Court TV Canada, owned by CHUM Limited (and later acquired by CTVglobemedia which then sold its assets to Bell Canada under the Bell Media subsidiary), launched on September 7, 2001. Unlike its U.S. counterpart, it did not relaunch under the TruTV name and continued its previous format until August 30, 2010, when, as part of a wider licensing agreement with Discovery Communications and CTV, Court TV Canada was rebranded as a Canadian version of Investigation Discovery.

The U.S. version of Court TV had earlier been approved by the Canadian Radio-television and Telecommunications Commission as an eligible foreign channel in 1997, and indeed, had been carried by several Canadian service providers prior to the launch of the domestic service. Even after its rebrand, TruTV was never withdrawn as an eligible foreign service for carriage on cable and satellite, meaning that, particularly with the end of the licensing agreement with CHUM, there were few theoretical hurdles that prevented TruTV from re-emerging on Canadian service providers.

Ultimately, the rights to TruTV's original programs have been dispersed across other Canadian cable channels, particularly CMT and Action, both owned by Corus Entertainment, and OLN, owned by Rogers Media. Of the three networks, Action had been the predominant broadcaster of TruTV programming. On April 1, 2019, Action was converted to a new full-time Adult Swim network.

Latin America

The channel was launched on April 1, 2009, in Latin America replacing Retro, also owned by Turner Broadcasting System. The announcement was made on March 25, 2009, by Turner Broadcasting System Latin America. The channel has the same programming, idents, and bumpers from the U.S. version.

UK and Ireland

In May 2014, Turner Broadcasting System announced that it would launch a separate UK version of the U.S. channel. On February 16, 2017, Sony Pictures Television acquired the channel from Turner. On February 12, 2019, the UK channel was renamed True Crime.

Asia

The channel was launched on April 1, 2010, in several markets in Asia including Indonesia, the Philippines, and Singapore. The channel is owned and operated by Turner Broadcasting System Asia Pacific and has similar programming, idents, and bumpers to the U.S. version, but many are also created by the Turner regional office in Hong Kong.

See also

TBS (sister network also with a focus on comedy programming)
Comedy Central (direct competitor owned by Paramount Global)
Freeform (owned by The Walt Disney Company)

References

External links
 

Television networks in the United States
Warner Bros. Discovery networks
Television channels and stations established in 2008
English-language television stations in the United States
2008 establishments in the United States
Comedy television networks
Former General Electric subsidiaries
Former Liberty Media subsidiaries